Espíndola or Espindola is a surname. Notable people with the surname include:

Cacho Espíndola (1940–2004), Argentine actor
Esteban Espíndola (born 1992), Argentine footballer 
Fabián Espíndola (born 1985), Argentine footballer 
Facundo Espíndola (1992–2018), Argentine footballer
Hernan Espindola (born 1994), Argentine footballer
Luis Fernando Espindola (born 1975), Uruguayan footballer
Lucas Espíndola (born 1994), Argentine footballer
Lucas Espindola da Silva (born 1990), Brazilian footballer
Noelia Espíndola (born 1992), Argentine footballer
Raúl Espíndola (born 1958), Argentine footballer
Rodrigo Espíndola (1989–2016), Argentine footballer
Rodrigo Andrés González Espíndola (born 1968), German bassist and singer, see Rodrigo González (musician)